Dobie is the name of some places in the U.S. state of Wisconsin:

Dobie, Barron County, Wisconsin, an unincorporated community
Dobie, Douglas County, Wisconsin, an unincorporated community